Biswajit Das is an Indian poet who is an expert in marketing, business communication. He has authored 9 books and published more than 150 research articles.

Das is continuing his D.Litt. on sustainable real estate market. He has 26 years of experience in academia, industry and government. Besides that, Das worked as deputy registrar (academics) KIIT University, chairperson- doctoral programme, chairperson- marketing management area and is a member -academic council and member-board of management-KIIT University.

Published books

 "Business Environment-Problems and Prospects', SSDN Publishers and Distributors, New Delhi, First Edition: March, 2015.
 "Transnational Marketing Strategy' (First Edition) published by New Age International Publications, New Delhi, 2014,  Co-authored by Dr. Sanjay Sharan and Dr.I.Satpathy, India.
 "Journey of Slum Dwellers: A Socio-Eco-Environmental Crusade" published by LAP.-LAMBERT Academic Publishing GmbH&Co.KG, Germany co-authored by Dr. Basanta Kumar Sahani. 2012
 "Social Marketing & Tobacco Consumption Control" published by LAP.-LAMBERT Academic Publishing GmbH&Co.KG, Germany.  Co-authored by Dr.S.P.Rath, IHM, Aurangabad, India.2012
 "Real Estate Market" by Excel Books Publishers, co-authored by Prof. A.K.Pani, XLRI, Jamshedpur,  Publication Year : 2005, Pages : 406
 "Business Communication and Personality Development' by Excel Books Publisher, co-authored by Dr. Ipseeta Satpathy, KIIT University. , Publication Year : 2007, Pages : 331
 "Impulse: A Saga of Love", Collection of poetic stanzas, Paperback Edition, 2001.
 "The Treasured Feelings-A collection of poems and couplets, Pages: 110, Paperback Edition-2011
 "Socio-Economic Journey of an Impoverished Eastern Indian State' published by LAP.-LAMBERT Academic Publishing GmbH&Co.KG, Germany. , 2012
 "Case Study & Teaching :  Reading Material' (Private Circulation) by Dr. S.P.Rath, IHM-Aurangabad, University of Huddersfield, U.K. and Dr.Biswajit Das, School of Management, KIIT University, Bhubaneswar, Odisha. 2011
 "Devdas Decision Making' CD-ROM study material on an edu-tainment management concept (private Circulation) co-authored, 2005

References

1964 births
Utkal University alumni
Living people
Indian male poets
Poets from Odisha
Academic staff of Kalinga Institute of Industrial Technology
21st-century Indian poets
21st-century Indian male writers
People from Baripada